The 2010 Florida State Seminoles baseball team represented Florida State University in the 2010 NCAA Division I baseball season. The Seminoles played their home games at Dick Howser Stadium, and played as part of the Atlantic Coast Conference. The team was coached by Mike Martin in his thirty-first season as head coach at Florida State.

The Seminoles reached the College World Series, their twentieth appearance in Omaha, where they finished tied for fifth place after recording a win against Florida and losing a pair of games to TCU.

Personnel

Roster

Coaches

Schedule and results

Ranking movements

References

Florida State Seminoles baseball seasons
Florida State Seminoles
College World Series seasons
Florida State Seminoles baseball
Florida State
Atlantic Coast Conference baseball champion seasons